Caithness, Sutherland and Ross (Gaelic: Gallaibh, Cataibh agus Ros) is a constituency of the Scottish Parliament covering the northern part of the Highland council area. It elects one Member of the Scottish Parliament (MSP) by the first past the post method of election. It is also one of eight constituencies in the Highlands and Islands electoral region, which elects seven additional members, in addition to eight constituency MSPs, to produce a form of proportional representation for the region as a whole.

The constituency was formed for the 2011 Scottish Parliament election, and replaced Caithness, Sutherland and Easter Ross and part of Ross, Skye and Inverness West.

The seat has been held by Maree Todd of the Scottish National Party since the 2021 Scottish Parliament election.

Electoral region 

The Caithness, Sutherland and Ross constituency is part of  the Highlands and Islands electoral region; the other seven constituencies are Argyll and Bute, Inverness and Nairn, Moray, Na h-Eileanan an Iar, Orkney, Shetland and Skye, Lochaber and Badenoch.

The eight constituencies of the Highlands and Islands electoral region cover most of Argyll and Bute council area, all of the Highland council area, most of the Moray council area, all of the Orkney Islands council area, all of the Shetland Islands council area and all of Na h-Eileanan Siar.

Constituency boundaries and council area 

The Highland (council area) is represented in the Scottish Parliament by three constituencies. These are: Caithness, Sutherland and Ross; Inverness and Nairn and Skye, Lochaber and Badenoch.

The electoral wards used to create the re-drawn Caithness, Sutherland and Ross are:

In full: North, West and Central Sutherland; Thurso and North West Caithness; Wick and East Caithness; East Sutherland and Edderton; Cromarty Firth; Tain and Easter Ross
In part: Wester Ross, Strathpeffer and Lochalsh (shared with Skye, Lochaber and Badenoch)

Member of the Scottish Parliament

Election results

2020s

2010s

Footnotes

External links

Highland constituencies, Scottish Parliament
Scottish Parliament constituencies and regions from 2011
2011 establishments in Scotland
Constituencies established in 2011
Constituencies of the Scottish Parliament
Politics of the county of Caithness
Politics of the county of Sutherland
Alness
Invergordon
Tain
Thurso
Wick, Caithness
Dornoch
Brora
Golspie
Helmsdale